The white coat ceremony (WCC) is a ritual in some schools of medicine and other health-related fields that marks the student's transition from the study of preclinical to clinical health sciences.  At some schools, where students begin meeting patients early in their education, the white coat ceremony is held before the first year begins. It is an example of a matriculation. The ritual is a recent invention, first being popularized in the 1990s.

WCCs typically involve a formal "coating" of students.

Description

Over 100 medical schools in the United States now have a WCC, and many students now consider it a rite of passage in the journey toward a healthcare career.  Some schools also use this as a graduation from the entire program.

According to some, WCCs have taken on a quasi-religious significance which symbolizes a "conversion" of a lay person into a member of the healthcare profession and is similar to a priest's ordination to the priesthood, although it is notable that the white coat is a recent adoption by the medical profession. However, in many medical schools around the world students begin wearing their white coats during first-year anatomy class, so there is no official white coat ceremony.

In the nineteenth century respect for the certainty of science was in stark contrast to the quackery and mysticism of nineteenth-century medicine.  To emphasize the transition to the more scientific approach to modern medicine, physicians sought to represent themselves as scientists and began to wear the most recognizable symbol of the scientist - the white laboratory coat. This led to the more recent association of the white coat with medicine since its continued adoption.

History

WCCs originated in University of Chicago's Pritzker School of Medicine in 1989, but the first full-fledged ceremony was at the Columbia University’s Vagelos College of Physicians and Surgeons in 1993. In 1993, Dr. Arnold P. Gold, a teacher and pediatric neurologist, created the first full-fledged WCC at Columbia University College of Physicians and Surgeons. Before this ceremony, medical students typically received the Hippocratic Oath for the first time at commencement. This ceremony marks a change in tradition, introducing students to the Oath before starting their first year of study. This was intended to provide students with well-defined guidelines regarding the expectations and responsibilities appropriate for the medical profession prior to their first day of class. Since its conception at Columbia, the WCC has spread rapidly to schools of medicine, dentistry, pharmacy, osteopathic medicine, optometry, and nursing worldwide.

Since starting in the US, several medical schools in countries outside of the United States (such as Iran, Israel, Canada, Dominican Republic, Brazil and Poland) have also started holding WCCs. The ceremony is no longer limited to medical students; starting in 1995, US pharmacy schools started holding WCCs, with the difference that most pharmacy students receive their coats at the end of their first academic year. In 2003 a survey found that the majority of US pharmacy schools hold WCCs. An Arnold P. Gold Foundation-sponsored version of the WCC, or a similar rite of passage, is currently used by 97 percent of Association of American Medical Colleges (AAMC)-accredited schools of medicine in the United States, and takes place at medical and osteopathic schools in 13 other countries.

In December 2006 the first white coat ceremony was held by Fatima Jinnah Dental College (FJDC), in Karachi, Pakistan.

In October 2008 the white coat ceremony was held at the VU University Medical Center Amsterdam, it was the first ceremony held in The Netherlands. In 2011 Erasmus Medical Center in Rotterdam also participated in holding the ceremony at their medical faculty.

On October 13, 2010, the faculty of medicine at the University of Cologne, Germany, became the first German-speaking University to integrate this ritual into its programme. Initiated by then-student representative Hormos Salimi Dafsari in Cologne, the ceremony has been spread to various German cities such as Leipzig and Halle via channels of the German Medical Students' Association (bvmd).

On April 12, 2010, the University of Queensland's (Australia) School of Pharmacy became the first in Australia to adopt the ceremony for its incoming Bachelor of Pharmacy students.

On April 29, 2011, University of Warmia and Mazury in Olsztyn was the first medical school in Poland, that has introduced the White Coat Ceremony. 

In September 2011, Jagiellonian University in Kraków became the first medical school in Poland to introduce a white coat ceremony for the incoming class.

On February 28, 2011, the Faculty of Medicine at the Università del Piemonte Orientale "Amedeo Avogadro" in Novara became the first Italian medical school to introduce a white coat ceremony for its third-year students.

On October 5, 2012, the Faculty of Medicine at the University of Medicine and Pharmacy "Gr. T. POPA" of Iasi, Romania, became the first Romanian university to integrate this ritual, for its first-year medical students, into the symbolism of developing as a physician.

On October 8, 2012, the Medical University of Graz became the first university in Austria to celebrate a white coat ceremony of its third-year students.

On December 6, 2012, the School of Medicine at the All American Institute of Medical Sciences, Jamaica, became the first in Jamaica to introduce this ritual, for its Basic Sciences medical students.

In 2014 the Arnold P. Gold Foundation for Humanism in Medicine partnered with the American Association of Colleges of Nursing (AACN) to pilot the White Coat Ceremony at nursing schools.

On July 13, 2017, the medical school of the University Of Tripoli became the first Libyan University to introduce this event.

On September 18, 2019, the Faculty of Medicine of Tunis became the first in Tunisia to introduce this ritual in collaboration with Hygie Organization for the Promotion of Ethics.

See also 
 Pinning ceremony (nursing)

References

Ceremonies
Fashion-related occasions
Medical education
Rites of passage